Massimiliano Pescatori (born 22 January 1971 in Milan) is an Italian professional poker player.

His first tournament win was in the $300 limit hold'em event in the 2003 World Poker Challenge in Reno, Nevada. Three days later he won the Omaha High Low event. At the 2008 World Series of Poker he won the pot limit half Texas hold 'em, half Omaha hold 'em event, with its $246,471 first prize. At the 2015 WSOP, Pescatori won two bracelets in the $1,500 Seven Card Razz and the $10,000 Seven Card Stud Hi-Low Split-8 or Better events.

Pescatori has also finished in the money in eight World Poker Tour (WPT) events.

As of 2017, his total live tournament winnings exceed $4,475,000. His 66 cashes as the WSOP account for over $2,450,000 of those winnings.

WSOP Bracelets

Books 
Max Pescatori has co-authored two books on poker originally written in Italian.

References

Italian poker players
Living people
World Series of Poker bracelet winners
1971 births